Walthamstow School for Girls is single sex girls' secondary school situated in Walthamstow,  London. It currently educates 900 girls between the ages of 11–16.

Locally, the school is known as 'Green School'. It is close to Walthamstow Central and the Prime Meridian.

History
It opened in 1890 as a private school on West Avenue, then moved to Church Hill. The school was refurbished in 2009. It occupies three main buildings, which have areas dedicated to  subjects taught in the school. The school saw a new head teacher take over in September 2012.

Notable former pupils
Miranda Grell, Labour Councillor and first person to be found guilty of making false statements under the Representation of the People Act 1983
Frances Horovitz, poet and broadcaster
Ada Maddocks, trade unionist
Patricia Scotland, Baroness Scotland of Asthal, Attorney General for England and Wales from 2007 to 2010
Dorothy Wedderburn Principal of Bedford College and later Royal Holloway College
Naomi Ackie, actress

References

External links
 School Website
 Building improvements
 EduBase

Secondary schools in the London Borough of Waltham Forest
Girls' schools in London
Educational institutions established in 1890
Community schools in the London Borough of Waltham Forest
Walthamstow
1890 establishments in England